Tylodinidae is a family of sea snails or false limpets, marine opisthobranch gastropod mollusks in the superfamily Umbraculoidea.

Taxonomy

2005 taxonomy 
The family Tylodinidae consists of the following subfamilies (according to the taxonomy of the Gastropoda by Bouchet & Rocroi, 2005):

Genera
 Anidolyta
 Tylodina, the type genus

References

 WoRMS info on the family

External links

 
Taxa named by John Edward Gray